Armactica conchidia, the conchidia moth, is a moth of the family Nolidae first described by Arthur Gardiner Butler in 1886. It is found in Australia.

The adult moths of this species are dimorphic. The females are fawn, and the forewings have a prominent dark brown patch on the inner margin.

References

External links

 With images.

Chloephorinae